Ant & Dec are a British television presenting duo, consisting of Anthony McPartlin (born 18 November 1975) and Declan Donnelly (born 25 September 1975), from Newcastle upon Tyne, England.  Formed after their meeting as child actors on CBBC's drama Byker Grove, they performed together as pop musicians PJ & Duncan, the names of their characters from the series. 

The duo have since pursued careers as television presenters, and currently host Ant & Dec's Saturday Night Takeaway, I'm a Celebrity...Get Me Out of Here!, Britain's Got Talent, and Limitless Win. Previous hosting credits include SMTV Live, CD:UK, Friends Like These, Pop Idol, PokerFace, Push the Button, Red or Black?, and Text Santa. They presented the annual Brit Awards in 2001, 2015 and 2016.

In addition to presenting, the pair are actors and both had leading roles in the 2006 film Alien Autopsy. They also have their own production company, Mitre Television. In a 2004 poll for the BBC, Ant & Dec were named the eighteenth most influential people in British culture.

Background
McPartlin and Donnelly met while working on the BBC children's drama Byker Grove in 1989. After a shaky start, they soon became best friends.  They have achieved such popularity as a duo that they are hardly seen apart on screen. It is reported that they are each insured against the other's death, with the amount reportedly being around £1 million.

Career

Acting
Although McPartlin had gained some television experience with a brief stint on the children's television series Why Don't You?, which was broadcast on the BBC, Donnelly was the first of the two to acquire his place on the BBC children's drama Byker Grove. He joined in 1989, playing Duncan. A year later, McPartlin joined the cast to play PJ (series 2, episode 5). Their friendship began when their storylines collided, creating a friendship both on and off-screen. Byker Grove producer Matthew Robinson told them to "Stay together through any row you have, whatever it is, be together and you could be the future Morecambe and Wise. I think they have proved that in many ways."

Donnelly also played a stable boy in the film adaptation of the novel The Cinder Path in his teenage years. They also went on to co-star in the 2006 sci-fi comedy film Alien Autopsy.

Music

After leaving television, the duo turned their hand to pop music. Their first single was a song they performed as part of the group Grove Matrix, performed as part of the storyline in TV show Byker Grove, titled "Tonight I'm Free". The single had some success, and the duo recorded two albums under their character names of PJ & Duncan. Their most famous hit during this period was the BRIT Award nominated "Let's Get Ready To Rhumble", for which the video and moves were choreographed by Mark Short, who had previously worked with Tina Turner and Peter Andre. For their third album, the duo reinvented themselves under their real names of Ant & Dec. The album featured their signature single, "Shout".

During their time as primarily music artists, the pair released sixteen singles and three studio albums; however, none of their releases managed to reach number one, with their highest UK chart position being number three. The duo did, however, reach the top ten in Germany and Japan and even had a number-one single in Germany, with their cover of the Everly Brothers' "All I Have to Do Is Dream". Success also struck in other European countries. The duo had a short-lived revival in the music industry, releasing a song for the 2002 FIFA World Cup, titled "We're on the Ball". The track peaked at No. 3, being beaten by Will Young and Gareth Gates. On 23 March 2013, Ant and Dec performed "Let's Get Ready To Rhumble" as part of their show Ant and Dec's Saturday Night Takeaway, which powered the song to number one in the UK iTunes chart and on Sunday 31 March 2013 the track was revealed as the Official UK Number 1 single on The Official Chart on BBC Radio 1. The two donated all money made from the re-release to charity.

In February 2022 the pair released the charity single "We Werk Together", written by Ian Masterson, with RuPaul's Drag Race UK winners The Vivienne, Lawrence Chaney and Krystal Versace with the proceeds from the single going to the Trussell Trust. The song was performed on the first episode of the eighteenth series of Ant & Dec's Saturday Night Takeaway as the "End of the Show" Show, introduced by RuPaul.

Presenting

Children's television
Ant & Dec got their first presenting job in 1994 while still releasing music under the alias of PJ & Duncan. They co-presented a Saturday-morning children's show entitled Gimme 5, which was broadcast on CITV.  In 1995, the duo were once again offered a job on CBBC, this time presenting their own series, entitled The Ant & Dec Show. The series was broadcast from 1995 to 1996, and in 1996, Ant & Dec won two BAFTA Awards, one for 'Best Children's Show' and one for 'Best Sketch Comedy Show'. In 1997, a VHS release, entitled The Ant & Dec Show – Confidential, was made available in shops, and featured an hour of the best bits from two years of the programme, as well as specially recorded sketches and music videos.

In 1997, the duo switched to Channel 4, presenting an early-evening children's show entitled Ant & Dec Unzipped. This show also won a BAFTA but was dropped after just one series. ITV soon signed the duo in August 1998, and within weeks, were assigned to present ITV1's Saturday morning programmes SMTV Live and CD:UK, alongside Cat Deeley. The duo presented the shows alongside Deeley for three years, becoming the most popular ITV Saturday morning show. The programme's success was the mix of games such as Eat My Goal, Wonkey Donkey and Challenge Ant, sketches such as "Dec Says" and the "Secret of My Success", and the chemistry between Ant, Dec, and Cat. Two SMTV VHS releases, compiling the best bits from both shows, were released in 2000 and 2001, respectively. Ant & Dec also starred in the children's TV series Engie Benjy during their time on SMTV.

Ant & Dec made their permanent departure from children's television in 2001 after trying out formats like Friends Like These for BBC One in 2000 and Slap Bang with Ant & Dec for ITV in 2001 (which was basically SMTV in the evening even playing Challenge Ant against adults). They have since said that they left SMTV because the Pop Idol live finals were due to begin on Saturday nights on ITV in December 2001.

Primetime
Ant & Dec's first primetime presenting job came in the form of BBC Saturday-night game show Friends Like These, which was first broadcast in 1999 and made them known as presenters - a shift change from their acting days. The duo presented two series of the programme between 1999 and 2001. In 2001, the duo's contract with ITV was renewed for a further three years, following their appearances on SMTV Live and CD:UK, and received their first primetime presenting job on the station, presenting brand new Saturday night reality series Pop Idol and down to this success they had to leave SMTV behind. Pop Idol was broadcast for only two series before being replaced in 2004 by The X Factor, to which former Smash Hits editor Kate Thornton was assigned presenting duties.

In 2005, as part of the ITV's 50th birthday celebrations, they were back on television fronting Ant & Dec's Gameshow Marathon, a celebration of some of ITV's most enduring gameshows from the past 50 years. They hosted The Price Is Right, Family Fortunes, Play Your Cards Right, Bullseye, Take Your Pick!, The Golden Shot and Sale of the Century.

In 2002, Ant & Dec created and presented their own show, entitled Ant & Dec's Saturday Night Takeaway. The first series was not an overall success, but with the introduction of "Ant & Dec Undercover", "What's Next?", "Ant v Dec" and "Little Ant and Dec", the show became a hit. During the fourth series, Dec broke his arm, thumb and suffered a concussion whilst completing a challenge for the 'Ant vs. Dec' segment of the show. The incident involved learning how to ride a motorbike and jump through a fire ring. Dec failed to pull hard enough on the bike's throttle during the challenge, causing it to topple over and sending him flying through the air. The accident caused the pair to miss the Comic Relief charity telethon of 2005. In 2006, the first episode of series five saw the duo abseil down the side of the 22-story high London Studios, where the show was filmed. Two DVDs, a best-bits book, and a board game of the series were released during 2004. The show was rested after 2009 as Ant & Dec said they were running out of ideas, and it became stale, as many of the popular features such as "Little Ant & Dec" and "Undercover" were dropped. Saturday Night Takeaway returned in 2013 and was a massive success; Ant & Dec resurrected previous hit features such as "Undercover", "Little Ant and Dec" (albeit with a new Little Ant and Dec) Win the Ads, and Ant v Dec, with new host Ashley Roberts. They also brought in new features such as the Supercomputer, Vegas or Bust, the End of the show 'show' where Ant and Dec perform with an act such as Riverdance or an Orchestra, and "I'm a Celebrity, get out of my ear!" where they have an earpiece in a celebs ear, and they tell them what to do while being filmed by secret cameras. The series was such a success that ITV recommissioned it for 2014 even before the 2013 series ended. A board game of the format was released. The final episodes of the 2020 series were filmed at home due to the COVID-19 pandemic, and the 2021 series was filmed with a virtual audience and precautions.

In August 2002, Ant & Dec fronted I'm a Celebrity...Get Me Out of Here!. They drew their highest viewing figures to date in February 2004: nearly 15 million tuned in to watch the third series. In May 2006, they were assigned to present coverage of the charity football match Soccer Aid. They were then invited back to present coverage of the second match in September 2008 but have been replaced by Dermot O'Leary from 2010 as the match clashed with Britain's Got Talent. In June 2006, they announced they had created a new game-show format for ITV, entitled PokerFace. The show featured members of the public gambling high stakes of money to win the ultimate prize. The first series began airing on 10 July 2006 and was aired for seven consecutive nights. The second series was broadcast in early 2007 and saw a move to a prime-time Saturday slot. Ratings for the series fell to below 3.5 million, and the series was subsequently axed in March 2007.

In April 2007, the duo signed a two-year golden handcuffs deal with ITV, reportedly worth £40 million, securing their career at the station until the end of 2009. In June 2007, they were offered the job of presenters on new ITV reality platform Britain's Got Talent by Simon Cowell. The series features contestants aiming to win £100,000 and spot on the bill at the Royal Variety Performance while performing and being judged by Cowell, actress Amanda Holden and former Daily Mirror editor Piers Morgan. The series was highly successful, drawing in nearly 12 million viewers, and led to the pair continuing to operate as hosts for future series, along with continual appearances in a regular feature on the ITV2 spin-off show Britain's Got More Talent. But, similarly to Saturday Night Takeaway, the twelfth series saw Dec present the live shows on his own (despite them both presenting the auditions shows).

The pair filmed six episodes for a new American game show, Wanna Bet?, in November 2007. The episodes were broadcast in 2008 but failed to attract enough interest for a second series to be commissioned. What You Wrote, another format created by the duo, was due to air in Autumn 2008 but was reportedly axed by ITV. In 2010, the duo debuted a replacement for Ant & Dec's Saturday Night Takeaway, entitled Ant & Dec's Push the Button. The series was a success, albeit not in the same way as Saturday Night Takeaway, and a second run of the programme was broadcast in 2011, but Ant and Dec later dropped the show in favour of reviving Saturday Night Takeaway.

Ant & Dec have also presented the game show Red or Black?, a creation of Cowell's, airing live on ITV in 2011 with a second series in 2012, but this was not a ratings success and was cancelled after the second series. On 24 December 2011, they presented ITV's charity initiative Text Santa with Holly Willoughby. Text Santa returned in 2012, 2013 and 2014 with Ant & Dec co-hosting alongside Christine Bleakley, Phillip Schofield, Holly Willoughby, Alesha Dixon and Paddy McGuinness.

In January 2016, Ant and Dec presented When Ant and Dec Met The Prince: 40 Years of The Prince's Trust, a one-off documentary for ITV. In 2016, they also presented The Queen's 90th Birthday Celebration, broadcast live on ITV.

In November 2016 the pair signed a new three-year deal with ITV estimated to be worth £30 million.

In November 2019, Ant and Dec's DNA Journey aired, which followed the pair as they retraced their family roots through DNA samples. In the show, they both found out that they have the same DNA marker, which means Ant and Dec are related as distant cousins. The DNA Journey format has since been done with other celebrities.

Starting from 2022, ITV aired Limitless Win, a game show with an endless jackpot. The show got renewed for a second season that started in January 2023.

Other activities
In 2006, a celebration of the show Spitting Image saw Ant and Dec having their own puppets made. They have also been made into cartoon characters on the comedy show 2DTV, and face masks in Avid Merrions Bo Selecta.

On 28 September 2008, news outlets reported that the pair were attacked by the Taliban whilst in Afghanistan to present a Pride of Britain Award.

In December 2008, the duo starred in their first seasonal advert in seven years, for the supermarket chain Sainsbury's. The duo appeared alongside chef Jamie Oliver. In March 2009, the duo filmed a short film for inclusion on Comic Relief, which documents a visit to a community centre for young carers in the North East. In September 2009, the duo released their official autobiography, entitled Ooh! What a Lovely Pair. Our Story. In October 2010, the duo appeared in several Nintendo adverts playing both the Wii and Nintendo DS.

In 2011 and 2014, they both appeared on the ITV2 comedy panel show Celebrity Juice. From February 2013 to March 2015 they appeared in adverts for supermarket Morrisons. Between February 2016 and March 2018, they had appeared in adverts for car company Suzuki.

In 2014, Ant & Dec designed a black and white striped Paddington Bear statue, one of fifty statues of the bear located around London prior to the release of the film Paddington, which was auctioned to raise funds for the National Society for the Prevention of Cruelty to Children (NSPCC).

In 2015, the pair made a cameo appearance on the U.S. adaptation of Saturday Night Takeaway, NBC's Best Time Ever with Neil Patrick Harris. They are also executive producers on the show.

In 2020, they celebrated 30 years of working together, releasing a book titled Once Upon A Tyne. It featured stories from their time as a duo and from behind the scenes of their shows.

OBEs
On 10 June 2016, it was announced that the duo would be awarded OBE status by Queen Elizabeth II at an investiture later that year. The pair said they were both "shocked, but incredibly honoured". McPartlin and Donnelly collected their awards for services to broadcasting and entertainment at Buckingham Palace from Prince Charles on 27 January 2017.

Guinness World Record
On 28 January 2020, the duo were awarded the Guinness World Record for "the most National Television Awards won consecutively for Best Presenter" which was at 18 as of 22 January 2019.  The record has since been broken 3 times by Ant and Dec themselves after they won the same award 3 years consecutively as of 13 October 2022, bringing the new record to 21.

Controversies
Law firm Olswang was commissioned to investigate the 2005 British Comedy Awards when the producers overturned the voting public's first choice, The Catherine Tate Show in favour of Ant and Dec's Saturday Night Takeaway for the People's Choice Award. The incident was also the subject of an investigation by media regulator Ofcom.

Following allegations of fraud in 2007, an investigation by auditors Deloitte Touche Tohmatsu discovered that two shows, Ant & Dec's Gameshow Marathon and Ant & Dec's Saturday Night Takeaway, had defrauded viewers participating in phone-ins. The programmes were subject to a further investigation by Ofcom which found that between January 2003 and October 2006 Ant & Dec's Saturday Night Takeaway had:

 selected competition finalists before the telephone lines were announced as closed
 staggered the selection of competition finalists, which meant that viewers entering the competition did not have a fair and equal chance of winning
 selected finalists based on their suitability to be on television and where they lived
 selected an individual already known to the production team to be placed on the shortlist of potential winners and who went on to win the competition.

Between September and October 2005, Ant & Dec's Gameshow Marathon had:

 on six occasions in the Prize Mountain competition, selected winners based on their suitability to be on screen
 failed to account for almost half of the competition entries

The pair were ridiculed for their alleged participation in the fraud on the front cover of the satirical magazine Private Eye.

On 30 September 2008, Ant & Dec were sued for $US30 million by Greek American stand-up comedian and actor Ant for using the name 'Ant' in the United States. The lawsuit, among other things, alleged trademark infringement and fraud. The suit was dismissed in May 2010. The pair have had the UK registered trademark for 'Ant & Dec' in the category of 'Entertainment services' since 2003.

Acting
The pair have, albeit infrequently, returned to acting, both on stage and screen. They played themselves in the film Love Actually (in which Bill Nighy's character addressed Dec as "Ant or Dec"). They have returned to their Geordie roots in a one-off tribute to The Likely Lads and also by returning to Byker Grove for Geoff's funeral.PJ & Duncan Return. Youtube.com (29 February 2008). Retrieved 5 May 2012.

In 1998, the pair starred in the pantomime Snow White and the Seven Dwarfs at Sunderland's Empire Theatre alongside Donnelly's partner at the time Clare Buckfield. The show was financially unsuccessful, making £20,000 less than it cost to stage, with the duo footing a large share of the shortfall.

Ant & Dec's most recent acting appearance was in the film Alien Autopsy released in April 2006. The film gained positive reviews with critics praising the pair's acting performance but lost more than half of its budget at the box office. In 2013, they reprised their roles as P.J. and Duncan on Ant & Dec's Saturday Night Takeaway.

Awards

National Television AwardsWinsNTAs by number won

NTAs by show number wonNominations/Awards that they didn't win'''

Filmography

Films

Television advertisements

Television idents
ITV "Celebrities" idents (3 idents, 2002)
ITV "Abstract celebrities" idents (5 idents, 2003)

Apps
An official Saturday Night Takeaway app known as Studio Rush'' launched on 30 January 2013.

References

External links
 
 Speaker's Corner article

 
English hip hop groups
British children's television presenters
English comedy duos
English game show hosts
English pop music duos
Musical groups established in 1988
Musical groups from Newcastle upon Tyne
Male musical duos
Hip hop duos
Pop-rap groups
Telstar Records artists
ITV people
Entertainer duos